Józef Ciągwa, slov. Jozef Čongva (born March 19, 1939, in Jurgów) – Polish lawyer of Slovak origin, translator, lecturer at University of Silesia in Katowice, professor of jurisprudence and president of the management board of Slovaks in Poland Association.

Biography 
He specialises in history of political and law doctrines, history of Poland and Polish law as well as history of Polish political and economic system. Having worked at many different Universities of southern Poland, he currently only lectures at University of Silesia in Katowice.

In 1983 he joined Social and Cultural Association of Czechs and Slovaks in Poland. During parliament elections in 1991 he was running for member of Parliament from electoral list of Electoral Block of National Minorities in Nowy Sącz Voivodeship. Since 1995 he is a leader of Slovaks in Poland Association. Until the end of 2012 he was a member of Joint Commission of Government and National and Ethnical Minorities on Association's behalf as a representative of Slovak society. He speaks Slovak and Hungarian as well as their local dialects fluently.

He is a licensed Tatra Mountains guide. Since 1992 he also is a state-registered translator for Czech and Slovak language.

Awards 
On January 8, 2009, in Bratislava he received Second Class Order of the White Double Cross (Rad Bieleho dvojkríža II. triedy) form the President of Slovakia, Ivan Gašparovič so as to honor his extraordinary merits for Slovak Republic, especially for his academic and cultural activities.

On November 15, 2013, he received Knight's Cross of Order of Polonia Restituta (Krzyż Kawalerski Orderu Odrodzenia Polski) for outstanding merits in work for national and ethnic minorities and academic work.

Festschrift 
In 2009, in order to celebrate his 70th birthsday anniversary, a festschrift was published. It's titled Państwo, prawo, społeczeństwo w dziejach Europy Środkowej. Księga jubileuszowa dedykowana profesorowi Józefowi Ciągwie w siedemdziesięciolecie urodzin, edited by Adam Lityński, Katowice: Wydawnictwo Uniwersytetu Śląskiego, 2009 .

Notable publications 
 Wpływ centralnych organów Drugiej Rzeczypospolitej na ustawodawstwo śląskie w latach 1922–1939, 1979
 Autonomia Śląska: (1922–1939), 1988
 Immunitet parlamentarny posłów Sejmu Śląskiego w latach 1922–1939: regulacja prawna i praktyka, 1992
 Słowacy w Powstaniu Warszawskim. Wybór źródeł, Towarzystwo Słowaków w Polsce, Cracow 1994, 
 Dzieje i współczesność Jurgowa. Dejiny a súčasnosť Jurgova: 1546–1996, 1996
 Rada Narodowa Republiki Słowackiej, Kancelaria Sejmu. Biuro Informacyjne, 1998

References

1946 births
Living people
Slovak emigrants to Poland
20th-century Polish lawyers